Al-Uthmaniyya Madrasa can refer to:

 Al-Uthmaniyya Madrasa (Jerusalem)
 Al-Uthmaniyya Madrasa (Aleppo)
 Madrasa al-'Uthmaniyya (later the Madrasa al-Kamiliyya) in Hayy Buzuriyya, Damascus.